Albert Wall Merck (died July 22, 2014) was an American politician and philanthropist. He served in the New Jersey Assembly from 1971 to 1974. He was a member of the Merck family.

References

2014 deaths
Members of the New Jersey General Assembly